Tobias Ide (born 1980) is a German strongman  competitor and entrant to the World's Strongest Man competition.

Biography
Ide started with training in 1995. In 2006 he competed for the first time in the final of Germany's Strongest Man where he placed seventh. A year later he would finish in fourth place. In 2008 he became the strongest man of Germany. The same year he was invited for the World's Strongest Man. He finished last in his qualifying heat and did not qualify for the final. In 2009 he finished second behind Florian Trimpl in Germany's Strongest Man.

Strongman competition record 
 2006
 7. - Germany's Strongest Man
 2007
 4. - Germany's Strongest Man
 2008
 1. - Germany's Strongest Man
 Q.  - 2008 World's Strongest Man
 2009
 2. - Germany's Strongest Man

References

External links
 Personal website
 Tobias Ide on gfsa-strongman.de

1980 births
Living people
German strength athletes